Juanita Mitchell White (October 12, 1929 – May 6, 2011) was an American politician.

From Hardeeville, South Carolina, White lived in Philadelphia, Pennsylvania, where she grew up in and raised her family. She then returned to Jasper County, South Carolina. White served in the South Carolina House of Representatives from 1980 to 1995 and was a Democrat.

Notes

1929 births
2011 deaths
Politicians from Philadelphia
People from Hardeeville, South Carolina
Women state legislators in South Carolina
Democratic Party members of the South Carolina House of Representatives
21st-century American women